"I Wrote the Book" is a song performed by American recording artist Beth Ditto. Produced by James Ford and Jas Shaw of Simian Mobile Disco. The song was released in March 2011 as the first single from the Beth Ditto EP on Deconstruction Records.

Music video
The music video for the song was uploaded to Ditto's official YouTube account on February 19, 2011, and contains several references to Madonna videos of the 1990s, such as "Justify My Love", "Vogue" and "Erotica".

Track listing
 "I Wrote the Book" – 3:24

Charts

Weekly charts

Year-end charts

References

2011 singles
Beth Ditto songs
Dance-pop songs
2011 songs
Songs written by Beth Ditto
Songs written by James Ford (musician)